Le Hénaff (modern orthography Henañ) is a surname of Breton origin meaning the elder. Like for the surname Heussaff or Gourcuff, the digraph -ff was introduced by Middle Ages' authors to indicate a nasalized vowel. It may refer to any the following people:

 René Le Hénaff  (1901–2005), French film editor and director
 Cédric Le Hénaff (born 1984), French football player
  (born 1914), French resistant

See also
Jean-Jacques Hénaff, French CEO of a Pâté company
Eugène Hénaff (1904-1966), French politician
Jeannine Henaff (born 1936), French electrical engineer
Marcel Hénaff (1942-2018), French philosopher and anthropologist
, French TV presenter

References

Surnames of Breton origin
Breton-language surnames